You Wanted to Be the Shore But Instead You Were the Sea is an album by American-Australian singer-songwriter Natalie D-Napoleon, released in Australia in 2020 and North America and Europe in 2021.

Reception

The album debuted on the Australian Independent Record Labels Association (AIR) 100% Independent Chart at number five for the week beginning October 6, reaching number one on the week beginning November 16.

Writing for XPress Magazine, music critic Conor Lochrie said about the album; "This is a raw and honest record and one that clearly values vulnerability." Reviewing the album for PopMatters, Scott M. Morrison, said the album "is audacious, assured, disarming, and even vulnerable." and said of its approach to the subject matter; "It does not idolize or embellish the women whose stories it tells. It does them a far greater service – it gives them an honest voice."

Track listing
All songs by Natalie D-Napoleon, except where noted.

"Thunder Rumor"  – 4:04
"How to Break a Spell" – 3:53
"Wildflowers" – 3:13
"Second Time Around" – 4:50
"Soft" – 5:08
"No Longer Mine" – 3:57
"You Wanted to Be the Shore But Instead You Were the Sea" – 4:40
"Gasoline & Liquor" (D-Napoleon, Brett Leigh Dicks) – 4:07
"Mother of Exiles" – 3:46
"Reasons" – 3:56
"Cut Your Hair" – 3:33
"Broken" – 4:57

Personnel
Natalie D-Napoleon – vocals, acoustic guitar, papoose
Dan Phillips – piano, celesta, cajon, percussion, background vocals
James Connolly – bass, double bass, background vocals
Doug Pettibone – electric guitar, pedal steel, mandolin
Angus Cooke – cello
Laura Hemenway – accordion
Jesse Rhodes – additional instrumentation
Freya Phillips - background vocals
Susan Marie Reeves - background vocals

Production notes
James Connolly – producer, engineer
Natalie D-Napoleon - producer
Jesse Rhodes – engineer, mixing
Dan Phillips - mixing
David Locke – mastering
Brett Leigh Dicks – photography, design

References

2020 albums